Carmen de la Legua Reynoso District is a district of the Constitutional Province of Callao in Peru, and one of the seven districts that comprise the port city of Callao.

In 1952 Carmen de la Legua Reynoso was founded by Lopez Pasos, Alejandro Ladron De Guevara, and Barios Medina. Antero Lizano, a pioneer of the city was elected the Organizational Secretary who established the zoning for Carmen de la Legua and distributed land to residents.

It was officially established as a district on December 4, 1964.

The current mayor of Carmen de la Legua Reynoso is Daniel Almanzor Lecca Rubio.

Geography
The district has a total land area of 2.12 km2. Its administrative center is located 54 meters above sea level.

Boundaries
 North: Callao District, San Martín de Porres District (in the Lima Province)
 East: Lima District
 South and West: Downtown Callao

Demographics
According to the 2005 census by the INEI, the district has 40,439 inhabitants, a population density of 19,075 persons/km2 and 8,745 households in the district.

External links
  Municipalidad de Carmen de la Legua Reynoso
 Todo Callao (in Spanish)

Districts of the Callao Region